Ferry & Clas was an architectural firm in Wisconsin. It designed many buildings that are listed on the National Register of Historic Places. George Bowman Ferry (1851 - 1918) and Alfred Charles Clas (1859 - 1942) were partners.

The partnership was established in 1890. The Book of the Office Work of Geo. B. Ferry and Alfred C. Clas, Architects, Milwaukee, Wisconsin was published in 1895. The partnership was dissolved in 1912.

Notable Works
First Unitarian Church (1891), 1009 E. Ogden Ave., Milwaukee, WI (Ferry & Clas) NRHP-listed
Pabst Mansion (1892), 2000 W. Wisconsin Ave., Milwaukee, WI (Ferry & Class) NRHP-listed
Central Library (1895), 814 W. Wisconsin Ave., Milwaukee, WI (Ferry & Clas) NRHP-listed
Mrs. Willis Danforth house (1897), 819 N. Cass St., Milwaukee, a 2.5-story house with half-timbering in the gable end (a Tudor Revival decoration).  Contributing building in 1986-NRHP-listed Cass-Wells Street Historic District.
L. D. Fargo Public Library (1899-1902), 120 E. Madison St., Lake Mills, WI (Ferry & Clas) NRHP-listed
Nye House (1901-12 remodel into Georgian Revival style), 1643 N. Nye Ave., Fremont, NE (Ferry & Class) NRHP-listed.  Now houses the Louis E. May Museum and Dodge County Historical Society.
Charles Danforth house (1904), 823 N. Cass St., Milwaukee, a 2.5-story house in Dutch Colonial Revival style, signaled by the gambrel roof. The walls are a distinctive dark brick. Charles was a salesman. In Cass-Wells Street Historic District.
Brittingham Park Boathouse (1909-1910), N. Shore Dr., Madison, WI (Ferry & Clas, with John Nolen) NRHP-listed
Hiram Smith Hall and Annex, 1545 Observatory Dr., Univ. of WI, Madison, WI (Ferry & Clas) NRHP-listed
Jackson District Library, 244 W. Michigan St., Jackson, MI (Ferry & Clas) NRHP-listed
Knapp–Astor House, 930 E. Knapp St. and 1301 N. Astor St., Milwaukee, WI (Ferry & Clas) NRHP-listed
Saint James Court Apartments, 831 West Wisconsin Ave, Milwaukee, WI (Ferry and Clas) NRHP-listed
Sauk City High School, 713 Madison St., Sauk City, WI (Clas, Alfred C.) NRHP-listed
Sauk County Courthouse, 515 Oak St., Baraboo, WI (Ferry & Clas) NRHP-listed
Franklyn C. Shattuck House, 547 E. Wisconsin Ave., Neenah, WI (Ferry & Clas) NRHP-listed
Cathedral of St. John the Evangelist, 812 N. Jackson St., Milwaukee, WI (Ferry & Clas) NRHP-listed
State Bank of Wisconsin, 210 E. Michigan St., Milwaukee WI (Ferry & Clas) NRHP-listed
State Historical Society of Wisconsin, 816 State St., Madison, WI (Ferry & Clas) NRHP-listed
Tripp Memorial Library and Hall, 565 Water St., Prairie du Sac, WI (Ferry & Clas) NRHP-listed
Jacob Van Orden House, 531 4th Ave., Baraboo, WI (Ferry & Clas) NRHP-listed. Currently houses the museum of the Sauk County Historical Society.
Joseph Vilas Jr. House, 610-616 N. 8th St., Manitowoc, WI (Ferry & Clas) NRHP-listed
Wisconsin State Reformatory, SE corner of Riverside Dr. and SR 172, Allouez, WI (Ferry & Clas) NRHP-listed

See also
Clas, Shepherd & Clas and Clas & Clas

References

Architecture firms based in Wisconsin